Psalterion can refer to musical instruments, including:
an Ancient Greek harp
the medieval box zither Psaltery